Gilbert Carson may refer to:

 Gilbert Carson (American football) (1901–1988), college football coach
 Gilbert Carson (politician) (1842–1924), Member of Parliament in New Zealand